Matthew James Goodwin (born 17 December 1981) is a British academic who is Professor of Politics in the School of Politics and International Relations at the University of Kent.  he is a commissioner of the Social Mobility Commission.

Early life and education
He graduated with a Bachelor of Arts degree with first-class honours in politics and contemporary history from the University of Salford in 2003 and a Master of Arts degree in political science from the University of Western Ontario in 2004, and completed his Doctor of Philosophy degree under the supervision of Roger Eatwell at the University of Bath in 2007.

Academic career
Goodwin was Associate Professor of Politics at the University of Nottingham from 2010 to 2015, Research Fellow at the Institute for Political and Economic Governance (IPEG) at the University of Manchester from 2008 to 2010 and, between 2010 and 2020, Associate Fellow at the Royal Institute for International Affairs at Chatham House where he authored numerous research reports on the rise of populism, Euroscepticism ahead of the Brexit vote, the different political tribes of Europe and the future of Europe.

Since 2015, he has been Professor of Politics in the School of Politics and International Relations at the University of Kent. Goodwin is also a former senior fellow for the think tank UK in a Changing Europe, and was the founding director of the Centre for UK Prosperity within the Legatum Institute.

His research focuses on British politics, radical-right politics, and Euroscepticism.

He is the co-editor of The New Extremism in 21st Century Britain (Routledge), and co-author (with Roger Eatwell) of National Populism: The Revolt Against Liberal Democracy. He is also the author of New British Fascism: Rise of the British National Party (Routledge) and co-author (with Robert Ford) of Revolt on the Right: Explaining Support for the Radical Right in Britain (Routledge, 2014). His research has appeared in the New Statesman, The Guardian, The Westminster Hour and Prospect magazine.

On 27 May 2017, he predicted that Labour would not reach 38 per cent of the vote in the 2017 general election and he would eat his book if they did. Labour did and, on 10 June, Goodwin chewed one page out of his book, live on Sky News.

Some researchers criticised Goodwin and Eric Kaufmann for joining a public debate on immigration which, they argued, encouraged "normalisation of far right ideas."

Goodwin is on the advisory panel of the Free Speech Union, a group founded by Toby Young that "stands up for the speech rights of its members" and "fights Twitter 'Witch-Hunts'". He has also served as Senior Advisor to the government's Education Committee on Left Behind pupils and has given evidence to the Public Bills Committee on the importance of defending academic freedom in universities

Books

Revolt on the Right (2014) 
 

This "sparky academic study of the rise of Ukip" was selected by The Guardian as one of the best politics books of 2014, and was named as Paddy Power political book of the year for 2015. Writing in the Financial Times, Kiran Stacey described it as "rich in analytical data" and containing "the occasional anecdotal gem", while in The Spectator Vernon Bogdanor wrote that "This rigorous analysis of the rise of Ukip is the most important books on British politics for years".

UKIP (2015) 
 

Writing in The Times, Philip Collins said that "Goodwin and Milazzo tell their tale with brio and a fine journalistic eye for the good story" and that "they are particularly good on the Ukip threat to Labour".

Brexit (2017) 
 

This "illuminating analysis of the many factors that swayed the referendum" was selected by Danny Dorling as Times Higher Education book of the week.

National Populism (2018) 
 

This book attempts to explain national populism using a '4D model': destruction of the national culture due to large-scale international migration; deprivation of opportunities due to globalization and in the post-industrial economy with its frequent disruptions and slow growth; growing distrust by working-class and rural voters who feel increasingly alienated by liberal cosmopolitan city-dwelling political and media elites; and de-alignment from traditional allegiances, which can be seen in high levels of voter volatility, or people switching from one party to another between elections.

Values, Voice and Virtue (2023) 
Values, Voice and Virtue: The New British Politics will be published by Penguin Books in March 2023. This incorporates material from This England: Nation, Identity and Belonging, a book evaluating Brexit, populism and immigration, which was due to be published by Penguin Press in 2021 but subsequently abandoned.

Honours
In 2014, aged 33, Goodwin was awarded the Richard Rose Prize by the Political Studies Association, which is given to one early career academic each year for their contribution to research.

See also 

 David Goodhart
 Eric Kaufmann

References

External links
 
 Matt Goodwin's Substack newsletter

1981 births
Living people
Alumni of the University of Salford
University of Western Ontario alumni
Alumni of the University of Bath
British political scientists
Academics of the University of Manchester
Academics of the University of Nottingham
Academics and writers on far-right extremism
Chatham House people